NFSU may refer to:

 National Forensic Sciences University, Gujarat, India
 Need for Speed: Underground, a 2003 racing video game
 Need for Speed: Undercover, a 2008 racing video game